Kim Chan-ki (30 December 1931 – 1 February 2011) was a South Korean footballer.

References

External links
 
 

1931 births
2011 deaths
South Korean footballers
Asian Games medalists in football
Footballers at the 1958 Asian Games
Footballers at the 1962 Asian Games
Medalists at the 1958 Asian Games
Medalists at the 1962 Asian Games
Kyung Hee University alumni
Footballers from Seoul
1960 AFC Asian Cup players
AFC Asian Cup-winning players
Asian Games silver medalists for South Korea
Association football defenders
Footballers at the 1964 Summer Olympics
South Korean football managers